Moesin is a protein that in humans is encoded by the MSN gene.

Moesin (for membrane-organizing extension spike protein) is a member of the ERM protein family which includes ezrin and radixin. ERM proteins appear to function as cross-linkers between plasma membranes and actin-based cytoskeletons. 

Moesin is localized to filopodia and other membranous protrusions that are important for cell–cell recognition and signaling and for cell movement.

Interactions 

Moesin has been shown to interact with:

 CD43 
 ICAM3 
 Neutrophil cytosolic factor 1, 
 Neutrophil cytosolic factor 4 
 VCAM-1
 EZR

References

Further reading 

 
 
 
 
 
 
 
 
 
 
 
 
 
 
 
 

Human proteins